Ludwig Wieder (22 March 1900 – 2 December 1977) was a German international footballer.

References

1900 births
1977 deaths
Association football forwards
German footballers
Germany international footballers
1. FC Nürnberg players
German football managers
Alemannia Aachen managers